Abderrahmane Mehdi Hamza (born 19 February 1992) is an Algerian racing cyclist, who last rode for UCI Continental team . He rode at the 2013 UCI Road World Championships.

Major results

2014
 10th Circuit d'Alger
2015
 4th Overall Tour Internationale d'Oranie
2016
 2nd Overall Tour du Sénégal
1st Stage 3
 7th Circuit de Constantine
2017
 3rd Road race, National Road Championships
2018
 1st Stage 1 Tour d'Algérie
 2nd Overall Tour du Sénégal
 2nd Grand Prix de la Pharmacie Centrale
 10th Overall Tour International de la Wilaya d'Oran

References

External links
 

1992 births
Living people
Algerian male cyclists
Competitors at the 2018 Mediterranean Games
Place of birth missing (living people)
Mediterranean Games competitors for Algeria
21st-century Algerian people
20th-century Algerian people